Raymond Comstock Thorne (April 29, 1887 – January 10, 1921) was an American competition swimmer who represented the United States at the 1904 Summer Olympics in St. Louis, Missouri. In the 1904 Olympics he won a silver medal as a member of American 4×50 yard freestyle relay team and was sixth in the 50 yards swimming. He was born in Chicago, Illinois, and died in a car crash in Los Angeles, California.

See also
 List of Olympic medalists in swimming (men)

References

1887 births
1921 deaths
American male freestyle swimmers
Olympic silver medalists for the United States in swimming
Road incident deaths in California
Swimmers from Chicago
Swimmers at the 1904 Summer Olympics
Medalists at the 1904 Summer Olympics